Sotoa is a genus of orchid, a relatively new genus described in 2010. It is native to western Texas and to Mexico as far south as Oaxaca. Only one species is known, Sotoa confusa.

Sotoa confusa is very rare in Texas. It was collected in 1931 in the Chisos Mountains inside Big Bend National Park, the specimens at the time misidentified as Spiranthes durangensis (now a synonym of Schiedeella saltensis). The material was not recognized as a distinct taxon until years later. It was not until 2008 that a live population was discovered.

See also 
 List of Orchidaceae genera

References

External links 

Orchids of Mexico
Flora of Texas
Orchids of the United States
Monotypic Orchidoideae genera
Cranichideae genera
Spiranthinae
Big Bend National Park